Phostria earlalis is a moth in the family Crambidae. It was described by Charles Swinhoe in 1906. It is found on Borneo.

References

Phostria
Moths described in 1906
Moths of Borneo